"Mashed Potatoes U.S.A." is a rhythm and blues song by James Brown and his Famous Flames. Released in 1962 as a single by King Records, it reached #82 on the Pop chart and #21 on the R&B chart. The title refers to the Mashed Potato dance popular at the time.

The song is a travelogue set over a strummed guitar/organ riff with a muted trumpet providing a jazz counterpoint to the vocal delivery. The bridge consists of the entire band repeating a two-chord riff.

In the song, Brown asserts "Here I am and I'm back again," then states his plan to bring the mashed potatoes to the cities he will tour. He then name checks his itinerary, starting with New York City and ending with his home town, Augusta, Georgia.

See also
 "(Do the) Mashed Potatoes"

References

1962 singles
James Brown songs
1962 songs
Songs written by James Brown
King Records (United States) singles